Ines Müller is a former German pair skater who competed with Ingo Steuer. They placed 7th at two European Championships. Müller quit after the 1990–1991 season.

Results 
(with Ingo Steuer)

References

Living people
German female pair skaters
Year of birth missing (living people)